Robert Orben (March 4, 1927 – February 2, 2023) was an American professional comedy writer and magician. He wrote multiple books on comedy, mostly collections of gags and "one-liners" originally written for his newsletter, Orben's Current Comedy, and also wrote books for magicians. Later, Orben moved into politics, and in 1973 he became head speechwriter to Vice President Gerald R. Ford. 

Orben died at a nursing home in Alexandria, Virginia, on February 2, 2023, at the age of 95.

References

External links
 

1927 births
2023 deaths
Academy of Magical Arts Literature & Media Fellowship winners
American comedy writers
American magicians
People from New York City